Four Wheel Drive is the fourth studio album by Canadian rock band Bachman–Turner Overdrive, released in 1975 (see 1975 in music). It peaked at No. 1 in Canada on the RPM national albums chart on October 4 and again on October 18, 1975 while hitting No. 5 on the U.S. Pop Albums chart. The most popular single from the album, "Hey You," was written by Randy Bachman. It reached No. 1 in Canada, holding the top position on the RPM national singles chart for two weeks in June, 1975, and No. 21 on the U.S. charts. Some reviews stated the song was directed at Bachman's former Guess Who bandmate, Burton Cummings. "Quick Change Artist" was released as a single in Canada only, and reached No. 13 on the RPM chart.

According to liner notes supplied with the BTO compilation CD The Anthology, Mercury Records had wanted a quick follow-up to the highly successful Not Fragile album.  Thus, Four-Wheel Drive was recorded in six days, much of it containing material that was left over from the Not Fragile sessions.

Track listing

Personnel
Randy Bachman – vocals, lead guitars, acoustic guitar
Blair Thornton – lead guitars, slide guitar, background vocals
C.F. Turner –  vocals, bass guitar
Robbie Bachman – drums, percussion, background vocals

Production
Producer: Randy Bachman
Engineer: Mark Smith
Mastering: Tom "Curly" Ruff
Director: Bruce Allen
Art direction: Jim Ladwig
Design: Joe Kotleba
Cover construction: Parvis Sadighian
Art Design: Ryan Walsh, Alex Does
Photography: John Brott, Tom Zamiar

Charts

Certifications

References

1975 albums
Bachman–Turner Overdrive albums
Mercury Records albums
Juno Award for Album of the Year albums